Dopasia hainanensis, the Hainan glass lizard, is a species of lizard of the Anguidae family. It is endemic to Hainan Island in China.

References

Dopasia
Lizards of Asia
Reptiles of China
Endemic fauna of Hainan
Reptiles described in 1983